Shook-Welch-Smathers House is a historic home located at Clyde, Haywood County, North Carolina. It was built over three principal periods of construction in the 19th century: c. 1810–1820; c. 1840–1860; and c. 1890–1900.  It is a two-story, frame dwelling sheathed in weatherboard and exhibits Georgian and Late Victorian style design elements.  It features a full-facade double-tier porch.

It was listed on the National Register of Historic Places in 2008.

The house is home to the Shook Museum, operated by the Haywood County Historical and Genealogical Society.

References

External links
 Shook Museum - Facebook site

Clyde, North Carolina
Houses on the National Register of Historic Places in North Carolina
Georgian architecture in North Carolina
Victorian architecture in North Carolina
Houses completed in 1820
Houses in Haywood County, North Carolina
National Register of Historic Places in Haywood County, North Carolina
Museums in Haywood County, North Carolina